Cytomegalic inclusion body disease (CIBD) also known as cytomegalic inclusion disease (CID) is a series of signs and symptoms caused by cytomegalovirus infection, toxoplasmosis or other rare infections such as herpes or rubella viruses. It can produce massive calcification of the central nervous system, and often the kidneys.

Cytomegalic inclusion body disease is the most common cause of congenital abnormalities in the United States. It can also cause pneumonia and other diseases in immunocompromised patients, such as those with HIV/AIDS or recipients of organ transplants.

Presentation
Various systems are affected:
 CNS abnormalities – microcephaly, intellectual disability, spasticity, epilepsy, periventricular calcification
 Eyes – choroidoretinitis and optic atrophy
 Ear – sensorineural deafness
 Liver – hepatosplenomegaly and jaundice due to hepatitis
 Lung – pneumonitis (interstitial pneumonitis)
 Heart – myocarditis
 Thrombocytopenic purpura, haemolytic anaemia
 GI diseases in AIDS patients
 Late sequelae in individuals asymptomatic at birth – hearing defects and reduced intelligence

The cells of the infected organ show intranuclear inclusion giving the nucleus classical owls eye appearance.
Further tests like ELISA can be used to detect the antigen. Virus can be grown in cell culture also.

References

Viral infections of the central nervous system
Cytomegalovirus-associated diseases